Robbie Robertson is a musician.

Robbie Robertson may also refer to:

Robbie Robertson (album), self-titled album by the musician
Robbie Robertson (comics), fictional character
Robbie Robertson, Miss Mississippi in 1966
Robie Robertson, awarded the Academy Award for Best Visual Effects for Marooned

See also
Robert Robertson (disambiguation)
Robert "Roby" or "Robbi" Roberson, Pentecostal pastor acquitted in the Wenatchee child abuse prosecutions